Monopoly is the third studio album by Tuks.

Critical reception

The album was well received. Channel24 gave the album a 4/5, stating: "Expectedly, a lot of people might find the album exhaustive and preachy, and in some cases they might have a point – Tuks does seem to go on a bit. But at a time when most of local hip hop seems to apologetically fit itself into a commercial mould, Tuks’ impassioned audacity comes as a welcome breath of fresh air."

Accolades

The album went on to win him three awards: a Metro FM Music Award for Best Hip Hop Album and Hype Magazine Hip Hop Awards for Best Album and Best Solo Artist.

Track listing

References

2009 albums
Tuks Senganga albums